Bradley Lake is a natural lake on the Oregon Coast in Coos County, Oregon, United States, about  south of Bandon.

References

Lakes of Oregon
Lakes of Coos County, Oregon